Kolding IF Women is a women's football club from Kolding, Denmark, playing in Elitedivisionen, the premier Danish women's football league. The club is currently playing in the Danish top division, the Elitedivisionen, and they play their home matches at the Kolding Stadium. The team was previously named KoldingQ.

History 
The club was established on 1 August 2009 as a cooperation between the women's department of Nr. Bjært Strandhuse IF and Kolding Boldklub. The goal of the new club was to become the best town regarding women's football and to be one of the top teams in the premier Danish women's football league Elitedivisionen. The team should use the training facilities of Kolding Boldklub on Mosevej Sportsplads.

The team has had good results in the Danish Futsal Championship. In 2009 Kolding Boldklub won silver at the Danish Championship in futsal, defeated by OB in the final. The following two years the team took silver in the Danish Futsal Championship under the new name KoldingQ, after being defeated by Team Viborg and Skovbakken. In 2012 the team took bronze.

In 2013 Lotte Troelsgaard joined the team, she has been a part of the Danish national team for several years. The following year, in 2014 her twin sister Sanne Troelsgaard who is one of the profiles on the national team joined the team. They played together for KoldingQ for three seasons, winning the bronze medal in the Elitedivisionen in 2014/15, 2015/16. After the 2016/17 season Sanne Troelsgaard left the club and went to play football in Sweden instead for the Damallsvenskan club FC Rosengård.

Early in 2017 another profile from the Danish national team signed contract for KoldingQ; when the goal keeper Stina Lykke Petersen moved back to Denmark in order to be closer to her family and friends. She chose to play for KoldingQ without wage even though she had offers from clubs from other countries, she chose a Danish club in order to be closer to her family and friends. The club competed against Skovbakken to win the bronze medal in Elitedivisionen, but in the final round Skovbakken was one point ahead of KoldingQ. Both teams won their last matches, KoldingQ beat BSF with 10-0 with five goals by Sanne Troelsgaard, it was not enough in order to win the bronze medal, because Skovbakken also won their final match 3-1 against Vejle.

Squad

References

External links
 Official website

Women's football clubs in Denmark
Kolding